Visa requirements for Peruvian citizens are administrative entry restrictions by the authorities of other states placed on citizens of Peru. As of March 15, 2022, Peruvian citizens had visa-free or visa on arrival access to 135 countries and territories, ranking the Peruvian passport 36th overall and 8th in the American continent in terms of world travel freedom according to the Henley Passport Index.

The Schengen Area introduced visa free access for Peruvian citizens for 90 days on 15 March 2016.

The United Kingdom introduced Visa free access for Peruvian citizens for stays less than six months starting on November 9, 2022.

South American countries do not even require a passport as a document to allow Peruvian citizens to visit their countries as tourist; a national or state-issued ID card is enough. Nevertheless, this piece of identification must be in a good conservation state and less than ten years from its issue date, according to agreements signed in Mercosur's treaties.

Visa requirements map

Visa requirements 
Visa requirements for holders of normal passports traveling for tourist purposes:

Peru is an associated member of Mercosur. As such, its citizens enjoy unlimited access to any of the full members (Argentina, Brazil, Paraguay and Uruguay) and other associated members (Bolivia, Chile, Colombia and Ecuador) with the right to residence and work, with no requirement other than nationality. Citizens of these nine countries (including Peru) may apply for the grant of "temporary residence" for up to two years in another country of the bloc. Then, they may apply for "permanent residence" just before the term of their "temporary residence" expires.

Dependent and autonomous territories

Unrecognized or partially recognized countries

APEC Business Travel Card

Holders of an APEC Business Travel Card (ABTC)  travelling on business do not require a visa to the following countries:

1 – up to 90 days
2 – up to 60 days
3 – up to 59 days

The card must be used in conjunction with a passport and has the following advantages:
undertake legitimate business in participating economies
expedited border crossing in all member economies, including transitional members
expedited scheduling of visa interview (United States)

See also 

 Visa policy of Peru
 Peruvian passport

References and notes
References

Notes

Peru
Foreign relations of Peru